The Nahanarvali, also known as the Nahavali, Naha-Narvali, and Nahanavali, were a Germanic tribe mentioned by the Roman scholar Tacitus in his Germania.

According to Tacitus, the Nahanarvali were one of the five most powerful tribes of the Lugii, living between the Oder and the Vistula. Tacitus mentions the Naharvali as the keepers of the sanctuary of the Lugii, a grove dedicated to the twin gods Alcis.

The Nahanarvali are speculated by modern scholars to be the same as the Silingi. While Tacitus did not mention the Silingi, he claimed that the Naharvali were approximately the same area as Ptolemaeus had placed the Silingi.

See also

List of Germanic peoples

References

Sources
Tacitus, Germania.XLIII

Early Germanic peoples
Lugii